Volgotanker ('"Volgotanker" Volga Oil Tanker Shipping JSC') is a Russian company engaged in the business of tank storage,transporting oil and oil products by tanker ship along the inland waterways and coastal seas of European Russia. It is headquartered in Samara.

The company was re-incorporated in October 2020.

History

Soviet period 
The history of Volgotanker goes back to the Oil Fleet Agency, part of the Volga State Shipping Company, which was established in 1923. In 1938, the agency was spun off into a separate state-owned company, called Volgatanker. Its mandate was to ship crude oil and oil products, primarily coming from the Baku oil fields, from the Caspian port of Astrakhan to Russia's industrial centers along the Volga and Kama. The service turned out to be highly important during the Second World War, when most of the railway lines connecting the Caucasus with Central Russia were cut by enemy action in 1942. Fifty-nine of the company's barges were sunk or damaged during the war, primarily by Luftwaffe's bombs and mines, with the loss of 123 sailors.

Soon after the war, the company also started transporting oil from Russia's so-called "Second Baku" - the oil fields in Bashkiria and eastern Tatarstan. As oil refineries were built along the Volga and its tributaries (e.g. at Ufa, Kstovo, and Syzran), their products, too, were taken to the markets throughout Russia by Volgotanker. The Volga-Baltic Waterway and Volga-Don Canal made it possible to deliver oil and oil products to Soviet ports on the Baltic, Azov and Black Seas as well. As of 1965, the company transported 3 million metric tons of oil and oil products per year. That year, Volgotanker boats also started transporting oil directly to Finnish ports.

When in August 1970, Volgotanker's Nefterudovoz-3 arrived to Kandalaksha, it was the first tanker ever to bring a cargo of oil directly from the Volga basin over the White Sea-Baltic Canal and into the White Sea.

By 1984, shipping volumes reached 35 million tons per year.

Post-Soviet

Since the late 1980s, the operations entered a decline along with much of the Soviet economy. In 1992, the company was privatized as a Joint-Stock Company (a corporation). With the decline of domestic operations, transportation of oil for export became the main line of business for the company, reaching 70% of its operations by 1993. It was not until the early 21st century that the volume of operations started to rise again.

Besides its traditional Baltic and Black Sea export directions, in the 2003 Volgotanker resumed using the White Sea-Baltic Canal. The plan was to transport 800,000 tons of fuel oil this way, for transfer to Latvian seagoing tankers at a floating transfer station near the Osinki Island in the Onega Bay, 36 km north-east of the port of Onega. The next year plans were for 1,500,000 tons. Local fishery authorities reported that some 74 km of the coast were contaminated by oil, at least 300 seabirds and a number of seals died. As a result, fines were paid by Volgotanker to the city of Onega, the transfer operations closed down by the Arkhangelsk Oblast authorities after only 220,000 tons have been exported, and the company did not get a permit for similar operations in the following year.

Yukos was Volgotanker's largest customer as well as a major shareholder. As Yukos started having problems with the government in the mid-2000s, it was replaced with Rosneft as the main customer.

In 2004, Volgotanker itself has been charged with tax evasion and levied a fine of $23 million. After a few rocky years, the company was eventually placed into bankruptcy in 2007, and sales of assets were impending as of the summer 2007. On November 11, 2007, one of their boats, Volgoneft-139, broke apart in the Kerch Strait, spilling at least 1,300 tons of fuel oil into the sea.

The fleet 

As of the mid-2000s, the company controlled 70% of liquid cargo transportation market in the basin of Volga and Kama, and carried about 10% of the total Russian exports of fuel oil. It owned 353 vessels with the total carrying capacity of over
1.2 million tons, as follows:
 204 tankers and ore-bulk-oil carriers with capacities ranging from 300 to 10,000 tons;
 95 barges with a capacity ranging from 1,000 to 9,000 tons;
 54 tugboats.
Most boats have a name consisting of the word Volgoneft and a number, e.g. Volgoneft-139.

References

Literature

External links
 Volgotanker Official Site (in English and Russian)  This website is no longer active.

Defunct shipping companies of Russia
Companies based in Samara, Russia
Tanker shipping companies
Shipping companies of the Soviet Union
Oil companies of the Soviet Union